Osyris alba, common name osyris, is a small  perennial plant in the genus Osyris belonging to the Santalaceae family.

Description
Osyris alba is a semiparasitic (hemiparasitic) broom-like shrub reaching  in height. The stem is woody, brown or dark green, sometimes creeping on the ground. This plant has numerous longitudinally striated branches, green when young. The leaves are linear, lanceolate, coriaceous, and persistent, although sometimes deciduous. They are produced during the winter, while in summer they are almost totally absent. The flowers are hermaphroditic or unisexual; in the latter case, the male and female flowers show differences associated with the timing of pollination. They are very small (1 or 2 mm), with four yellow-green tepals and four stamens. Flowering period extends from March to June. The fruits are small,  red, fleshy drupes,  in diameter. Their roots form haustoria that tap into the roots of nearby plants and extract their sap.

Distribution
The species is widespread in all countries of the Mediterranean basin, from Portugal to Turkey. It is present  in western Asia and in North Africa from Morocco to Tunisia and Libya.

Gallery

References

 International Plant Name Index

External links
 Schede di Botanica
 Biolib

alba
Flora of Lebanon
Plants described in 1753
Taxa named by Carl Linnaeus